Brush Hill can refer to:

Brush Hill, a historic mansion in Pennsylvania
Brush Hill, Alberta, a community in Canada
Brush Hill Historic District, in Massachusetts
Brush Hill Local Nature Reserve, in Buckinghamshire, England